Manchester Sports Guild (MSG) was a jazz and folk music venue in Manchester, England, that flourished from 1961 to 1973.

History 
Manchester Sports Guild was a membership organisation founded in 1953 in Manchester, England, to promote amateur sports.  L.C. Jenkins ("Jenks") was the founding General Secretary. Shortly after moving into its first venue on Market Street, MSG, almost by accident, began promoting jazz. In 1961, MSG acquired its second venue at 8–10 Long Millgate, opposite Chetham's School of Music, near the Manchester Cathedral that became known as MSG's "Sports and Social Centre". The venue flourished until about 1973, when it was closed for imminent demolition, which didn't occur for a few years. The Long Millgate location was an old brick Victorian building with a bar on the ground floor, folk music upstairs, and jazz in its unadorned cellar. In 1962, shortly after opening the new venue, Jenks appointed Jack Swinnerton as Jazz Organiser. Henceforth, the MSG began booking internationally known jazz artists, performers who leaned more towards blues and traditional and swing idioms). The jazz cellar was also the centre of afterhours jam-sessions with American jazz artists who had, earlier in the evening, performed at other Manchester venues, particularly the Free Trade Hall.

In 1964, The Observer stated: "In the Manchester Sports Guild they have the best jazz centre in the country 

Frank Duffy ran the folk scene, upstairs. The Urbis building sits on the site.

Selected performing artists

Jazz and blues (in the cellar) 

 Alvin Alcorn (1912–2003)
 Henry "Red" Allen (1908–1967)
 Jimmy Archey (1902–1967)
 Acker Bilk (1929–2014)
 Ruby Braff (1927–2003)
 Sandy Brown (1929–1975)
 Buck Clayton (1911–1991)
 Bill Coleman (1904–1981)
 Wild Bill Davison (1906–1989)
 Vic Dickenson (1906–1984)
 Dutch Swing College Band
 Al Fairweather (1927–1993)
 Pops Foster (1892–1969)
 Bud Freeman (1906–1991)
 Edmond Hall (1901–1967)
 John Handy (born 1933)
 Earl "Fatha" Hines (1903–1983)
 George Lewis (1900–1968)
 Alan Littlejohn (1928–1996)
 Humphrey Lyttelton (1921–2008)
 Wingy Manone (1900–1982)
 Louis Nelson (1900–1990)
 New Jazz Orchestra (1963–1970)
 Albert Nicholas (1900–1973)
 Johnny Parker (1929–2010)
 Emanuel Paul (1904–1988)
 Pee Wee Russell (1906–1969)
 Kid Thomas (1897–1987)
 Bruce Turner (1922–1993)
 Joe Turner (1907–1990)
 Alex Welsh (1929–1982)
 Bob Wallis (1934–1991)
 Ben Webster (1909–1973)
 Dicky Wells (1907–1985)
 Teddy Wilson (1912–1986)

Folk, pop, and poets (upstairs) 

 Clarence Ashley (1895–1967)
 Dominic Behan (1928–1989)
 Roy Budd (1947–1993)
 Tony Capstick (1944–2003)
 Martin Carthy (born 1941)
 John Cooper Clarke (born 1949)
 Art Garfunkel (born 1941)
 Mike Harding (born 1944)
 Rosie Hardman (born 1945)
 Bert Jansch (1943–2011)
 Bill Monroe (1911–1996)
 Christy Moore (born 1945)
 The Spinners
 Dave Swarbrick (1941–2016)
 Wally Whyton (1929–1997)
 Magna Carta

Selected discography

Jazz

Folk

MSG personnel 
 John Pye, Executive Director
 Jack Swinnerton, Jazz Secretary
 L.C. Jenkins ("Jenks") (né Leslie Charles Jenkins; 1918–1986), General Secretary
 Bryn Pugh, MC in the folk room
 Frank Duffy, initial Folk Secretary
 John Dronsfield ("Drony"), Frank's successor

Notes and references

Notes

References 

1953 establishments in England
1973 establishments in England
Defunct jazz clubs
Jazz clubs in the United Kingdom
Music venues in Manchester
Nightclubs in Manchester
Former buildings and structures in Manchester
Demolished buildings and structures in Manchester
History of Manchester
Culture in Manchester